The Bad Book is a 2004 book by Andy Griffiths, who wrote the novel The Day My Bum Went Psycho, with Terry Denton, who also did the illustrations. It is a compilation of stories, drawings, rhymes and poems about such quirky characters like 'Bad Baby', and 'Bad Daddy' doing such bad things like miss-throwing knives, and blowing up objects and people at Christmas. It was followed by The Very Bad Book (2010) and The Super Bad Book (2011)

Stories (in chronological order)

The Bad Book contains forty-five stories overall.

Bad Jack Horner - Nursery Rhyme
Bad Humpty Dumpty - Nursery Rhyme
Bad Diddle Diddle - Nursery Rhyme
The Bad Ant - Story
Joan Purst - Limerick
Greedy Little Grace - Poem
Bad Daddy and the Big Swing - Cartoon
Badtown - Story
The Old Lady who swallowed a Poo - Song
The Girl Who Slammed Doors - Limerick
Bad Riddles - Jokes
The Sad Bad Bad-man - Story
Little Willy - Poem
Jeff Pest - Limerick
Bad Mummy And The Very Busy Six-Lane Hig-way - Cartoon
Penny McRose - Poem
Bad Terence - Poem
Bad Baby - Cartoon
Silly Billy - Poem
Very Bad Riddles - Jokes
The Bad Little Boy, His Father and the Very Tall Mountain - Story
Bad Little Betty - Poem
Bad Daddy Says 'No' - Cartoon
Little Snotty Steve - Poem
Bad Baby's Christmas - Cartoon
Ruth Punny - Limerick
Pirates, Trucks, Bombs, Sharks, Dinosaurs and Football - Story
The Bad Knife-Thrower - Cartoon
The Girl Who Asks Too Many Questions - Story
Pete Pedderson - Limerick
Bad Mummy and the Big Cliff - Cartoon
The Bad Old Duke of York - Story
The Bad Granny - Story
Little Bad Riding Hood - Story
Peter, Peter Junk-food Eater - Poem 
The Bad Builder - Story
Ed & Ted and Ted's Bad Dog Fred - Story (Similar writing in The Cat On The Mat Is Flat) 
Very, Very Bad Riddles - Jokes
If You're Bad and You Know it - Song
The Day Nothing Bad Happened - Story
Bad Mummy and the Very Hungry Lion - Cartoon 
Very, Very, Very Bad Riddles - Jokes
Bad Baby at the Circus - Cartoon
Badword Puzzle - Puzzle
The Very Bad Story - Story
The Very, Very Bad Story - Story
The Very, Very, Very Bad Story - Story

Awards
In 2005 The Bad Book was awarded the BILBY Award for Younger Readers.

References

2004 short story collections
Short story collections by Andy Griffiths
BILBY Award-winning works
COOL Award-winning works
Pan Books books